Lasiodermini is a tribe of death-watch and spider beetles in the family Ptinidae. There are at least 3 genera and 30 described species in Lasiodermini.

Genera
These three genera belong to the tribe Lasiodermini:
 Lasioderma Stephens, 1835
 Megorama Fall, 1905
 Pseudolasioderma Logvinovskiy, 1978

References

Further reading

 
 
 
 
 

Ptinidae